Jason Christopher Bourque (born 6 September 1972 in Vancouver, British Columbia) is a Canadian film, television writer and director.

Career
Bourque has written and directed a wide variety of TV movies, series and documentaries, as well as over 60 commercials, short films and music videos. In 2014 he directed the thriller film Black Fly, his feature film debut.

References

External links

1972 births
Film producers from British Columbia
Canadian television directors
Canadian television producers
Canadian television writers
Film directors from Vancouver
Living people
Writers from Vancouver